Kristen Louise Renton (born September 14, 1982) is an American actress who had a recurring role as Ima Tite on Sons of Anarchy and also portrayed Morgan Hollingsworth on NBC's soap opera Days of Our Lives.

Personal life
Renton moved from Colorado to Florida at an early age.  Not married.

Career
At the age of sixteen, she started a career in modeling, and later got into acting. She has appeared in the films Ghouls, In the Mix, and Come Away Home. She has also made appearances on television, in such series as CSI: NY, The OC and The Glades.

Filmography

External links

Notes

1982 births
Living people
American soap opera actresses
Actresses from Denver
21st-century American actresses
American film actresses
American television actresses